The 2009 Davis Cup was the 98th edition of the most important tournament between national teams in men's tennis. Sixteen teams participated in the World Group and more than one hundred other took part in different regional groups. Spain won their fourth Davis Cup trophy, defending the title they had won the previous year. It is the first year that the ITF awarded ATP rankings points to the players competing in the World Group and related play-offs.

World Group

Draw

Final

World Group play-offs

 Date: 18–20 September

The eight losing teams in the World Group first round ties, and eight winners of the Group I second round ties compete in the World Group play-offs.

Seeded teams
 
 
 
 
 
 
 
 

Unseeded teams

 
 
 
 
 
  
 
 

Americas Zone

Group I
Participating Teams
  - advanced to World Group play-offs
 
 
  - promoted to World Group in 2010
  - relegated to Group II in 2010

Group II
Participating Teams

  - relegated to Group III in 2010
  - promoted to Group I in 2010
 
  - relegated to Group III in 2010

Group III
Participating Teams

  - relegated to Group IV in 2010
  - promoted to Group II in 2010
 
  - promoted to Group II in 2010
  - relegated to Group IV in 2010

Group IV
Participating Teams

  - promoted to Group III in 2010
  - promoted to Group III in 2010

Asia/Oceania Zone

Group I
Participating Teams
 
 
 
  - promoted to World Group in 2010
 
 
 
  - relegated to Group II in 2010
  - advanced to World Group play-offs

Group II
Participating Teams

 
 
  - relegated to Group III in 2010
 
 
  - relegated to Group III in 2010
 
  - promoted to Group I in 2010

Group III
Participating Teams

 
 
  Pacific Oceania - promoted to Group II in 2010
 
  - relegated to Group IV in 2010
  - promoted to Group II in 2010
 
  - relegated to Group IV in 2010

Group IV
Participating Teams

 
  - promoted to Group III in 2010
 
 
 
 
 
  - promoted to Group III in 2010

Europe/Africa Zone

Group I

Seeds:
 
 
 
 

Remaining Nations:

Draw

Group II
Participating Teams
 - relegated to Group III in 2010

 - promoted to Group I in 2010
 - relegated to Group III in 2010

 - promoted to Group I in 2010

 - relegated to Group III in 2010

 - relegated to Group III in 2010

Group III
Participating Teams
 
  - promoted to Group II in 2010
  - relegated to Group IV in 2010†
  - promoted to Group II in 2010
 
 
 
 
 
  - relegated to Group IV in 2010†
 
  - promoted to Group II in 2010
  - relegated to Group IV in 2010†
  - relegated to Group IV in 2010†
 
  - promoted to Group II in 2010

† Relegations to Group IV were ultimately not enforced, as Groups III and IV were reorganized into Group III (Europe) and Group III (Africa) for 2010.

Group IV
Participating Teams
  - promoted to Group III in 2010
 
  - promoted to Group III in 2010
  - promoted to Group III in 2010
  - promoted to Group III in 2010

Point Distribution

References

External links

Davis Cup draw details

 
Davis Cup
Davis Cups by year